Barkal is an upazila (sub-district) of Rangamati District in the Division of Chittagong, Bangladesh. Tribal people call it  as  Borhol বড়হল .

Geography
It has a total area of 760.88 km2.

Demographics

According to the 2011 Bangladesh census, Barkal Upazila had 9,396 households and a population of 47,523, 4.1% of whom lived in urban areas. 11.2% of the population was under the age of 5. The literacy rate (age 7 and over) was 44.5%, compared to the national average of 51.8%.

Administration
Barkal Upazila is divided into five union parishads: Aimachara, Barkal, Bushanchara, Borohorina, and Subalong. The union parishads are subdivided into 28 mauzas and 180 villages.

Subalong Union is known for its waterfalls and the natural environment of Kaptai Lake. Barkal Union is situated on the banks of the Karnafuli River.

See also
Upazilas of Bangladesh
Districts of Bangladesh
Divisions of Bangladesh

References

Upazilas of Rangamati Hill District